The 140th Street station was a local station on the demolished IRT Ninth Avenue Line in Manhattan, New York City. It had two levels. The lower level was built first and had two tracks and two side platforms and served local trains. The upper level was built as part of the Dual Contracts and had one track that served express trains that bypassed this station.

History
This station opened on September 17, 1879 and closed on June 11, 1940.

References

IRT Ninth Avenue Line stations
Railway stations in the United States opened in 1879
Railway stations closed in 1940
Former elevated and subway stations in Manhattan
1879 establishments in New York (state)
1940 disestablishments in New York (state)